Elsa "Ellen" Favorin (31 December 1853 Kuorevesi – 27 November 1919 Lohja) was a Swedish-speaking Finnish painter.

Biography

Her parents were Anders Abraham Favorin and Lovisa Ingman. After attending the painting schools in Helsinki and Stockholm, she continued her studies in Munich, Düsseldorf and at the Académie Julien in Paris. She often painted landscapes and was one of the artists who joined Victor Westerholm in the artists colony at Önningeby on the island of Åland. She died together with her sister in a fire at their home in Lohja in 1919.

Works

References

External links

1853 births
1919 deaths
People from Inari, Finland
Swedish-speaking Finns
Finnish women painters
19th-century Finnish painters
19th-century Finnish women artists
20th-century Finnish painters
20th-century Finnish women artists
Académie Julian alumni
Deaths from fire
Accidental deaths in Finland